Urban vitality is the quality of those spaces in cities that are capable of attracting heterogeneous people for different types of activities throughout varied time schedules. The areas of the city with high vitality are perceived as alive, lively or vibrant and they tend to attract people to carry out their activities, stroll or stay. However, the areas of low vitality repel people and can be perceived as unsafe.

The urban vitality index is a measure of this quality and in recent years it has become a fundamental tool for planning urban policies, especially for the intervention of spaces with low vitality. In addition, it is used for proper management of spaces with high vitality, as the success of certain areas can lead to processes of gentrification and touristification that, paradoxically, end up reducing the vitality that made them popular.

The concept of urban vitality is based on the contributions of Jane Jacobs, especially those of her most influential work, The Death and Life of Great American Cities. Jacobs criticized in the 1960s the modern and rationalist architecture defended by Robert Moses or Le Corbusier whose protagonist was the private car. She argued that these types of urban planning overlooked and oversimplified the complexity of human life in diverse communities. She opposed large-scale urban renewal programs that affected entire neighborhoods and built freeways through inner cities. Instead, she advocated for dense mixed-use development and walkable streets, with “eyes on the street” of passers-by helping to maintain public order.

Currently, the concept of urban vitality is revaluing Mediterranean urbanism and its history, in which public space, pedestrianity and squares are of great importance as centers of interaction and social cohesion, in opposition to the Anglo-Saxon urbanism of large urban infrastructures, long distances and car-centric.

Conditions for high urban vitality 

Urban vitality can be quantified thanks to the analysis of the elements that determine it. Among them are:
 Diversity of uses of the space that can attract different types of people for diverse activities and at various times, making the space constantly occupied, improving its security.
 Opportunities for personal contact with blocks, buildings and open spaces that are not too large, as they reduce the number of possible intersections and social interactions.
 Diversity of buildings with varied characteristics and ages, allowing people with different purchasing power to live in all areas of the city, avoiding the formation of ghettos.
 High population density, residential areas are essential to attract other types of activity.
 Accessibility for all people without depending on private transport, with pedestrian access being the most important, as it is the most democratic, sustainable and cheap, followed by access by bicycle and public transport.
 Distance to border elements, such as large buildings, ring roads, surface train tracks or large urban parks that discourage the use of the street.

See also

References 

Human ecology
Human geography
Sustainable transport
Urban planning
Urban sociology